Steel Umbrellas is the tenth studio album by Canadian rock band Saga. The songs were written for the US TV series Cobra. The album is the second produced after the reformation of the classic line-up, and the first one to feature two songs sung by keyboardist Jim Gilmour.

Track listing
All lyrics and music written by Saga, except "(You Were) Never Alone" by Saga and Gerald O' Brien; "Push It" by Saga, Craig Van Sickle and Steve Mitchell

Note
Alternate versions of the CD include the track "(Walking On) Thin Ice" in place of "Push It". "(Walking On) Thin Ice" was also used as a b-side for the second single release "(You Were) Never Alone", which also included an "edited version" of the album track that opens with a differently mixed intro. "Why Not?" was the first single from the album and also edited for the single release.

Personnel

 Michael Sadler – lead and backing vocals
 Ian Crichton – guitars
 Jim Gilmour – keyboards, backing vocals, lead vocals on "Shake That Tree" and "Say Goodbye to Hollywood"
 Jim Crichton – bass
 Steve Negus – drums, percussion
 Paula Mattioli, Fred White, Stu "The Rooster" Saddoris – backing vocals

Production

 Produced by Jim Crichton & Saga
 Music Supervisor – Spencer Proffer, Cherry Lane Music
 Recording Engineer – Jim Crichton
 Recording Engineer (Keyboards) – Steve Negus
 Mixed by Mike Ging
 Recorded and mixed at Goodnight L.A.B., Van Nuys, California
 Art Direction & Design – Vivid Images
 Front Cover Concept – Penny Crichton
 Photography – Penny Crichton 
 Front Cover Images – Joannis and Stephen Jacaruso for Vivid Images
 Steel Umbrellas by Heidi Coyle

References

External links
 

1994 albums
Saga (band) albums
SPV/Steamhammer albums